Sidney or Sydney Evans may refer to:

 Sidney Evans (footballer) (1893–?), or Sid, English footballer
 Sidney Evans (boxer) (1881–1927), or Sid, British boxer
 Sydney Evans (priest) (1915–1995), Dean of Salisbury
 Len Evans (footballer) (Sidney John Vivian Leonard Evans, 1903–1977), Welsh footballer

See also
 Evans (surname)